Athletes from the Socialist Federal Republic of Yugoslavia competed at the 1968 Winter Olympics in Grenoble, France.

Alpine skiing

Men

Men's slalom

Women

Cross-country skiing

Men

Ice hockey

First round
 Finland -   Yugoslavia 11:2 (3:0, 6:0, 2:2) 
Goalscorers: Lasse Oksanen 2, Esa Peltonen 2, Matti Reunamaki 2, Juhani Wahlsten, Veli-Pekka Ketola, Matti Keinonen, Matti Harju, Pekka Leimu - Albin Felc, Franc Smolej.

Consolation Round 
Teams in this group play for 9th-14th places.

 Yugoslavia –  Japan 5:1 (2:0, 0:0, 3:1)
Goalscorers: Tisler 2, Beravs, Felc, Mlakar – Iwamoto.

 Yugoslavia –  Austria 6:0 (2:0, 2:0, 2:0)
Goalscorers: Ivo Jan 3, Roman Smolej, Tisler, Klinar.

 France –  Yugoslavia 1:10 (0:6, 0:1, 1:3)
Goalscorers: Itzicsohn – Tisler 3, Ivo Jan 2, Felc 2, Beravs, Roman Smolej, Hiti.

 Yugoslavia –  Romania 9:5 (5:3, 1:1, 3:1)
Goalscorers: Roman Smolej 2, Tisler 2, Felc 2, Ivo Jan, Hiti, Jug – Iuliu Szabo 2, Tekei, Florescu, Geza Szabo.

 Yugoslavia –   Norway 3:2 (1:1, 0:0, 2:1)
Goalscorers: Hiti, Franz Smolej, Ivo Jan - Dalsören, Bjölbak.

Contestants
9. YUGOSLAVIA
Goaltenders: Anton Jože Gale, Rudolf Knez.
Defence: Franc-Rado Razinger, Ivo Jan, Ivan Rataj, Viktor Ravnik, Lado Jug. 
Forwards: Franc Smolej, Bogomir Jan, Boris Renaud, Albin Felc, Viktor Tišler, Rudi Hiti, Slavko Beravs, Miroslav Gojanovič, Roman Smolej, Janez Mlakar, Ciril Klinar.

Ski jumping

References
Official Olympic Reports
International Olympic Committee results database
 Olympic Winter Games 1968, full results by sports-reference.com

Nations at the 1968 Winter Olympics
1968
Winter Olympics